A drought is an extended period of months or years when a region notes a deficiency in its water supply.

Drought, The Drought, or variation, may also refer to:

People with the surname
James William Drought (1931-1983), American author
Cecil Charles Worster-Drought (1888-1971), British medical doctor, physician, neurologist

Music
 Drought (EP), a 2012 EP by Deathspell Omega
 The Drought (The Kill Devil Hills album), 2006
 The Drought (Puce Mary album), 2018

Other uses
 The Drought, a 1965 science fiction novel by British author J. G. Ballard
 "The Drought" (SATC episode), a 1998 television episode
 Drought, a 2011 speculative fiction book by Pam Bachorz

See also

 Worster-Drought (disambiguation)
 
 
 
 Dry Spell (disambiguation)
 The Drouth
 Draft (disambiguation), a word also spelled draught